Richard Little may refer to:

 Rich Little (born 1938), Canadian comedian
 Ricky Little (born 1989), Scottish footballer
 Dick Little (1895–19??), English footballer

See also
 Bingo Little, full name Richard Little, a fictional PG Wodehouse character
 Little Richard (1932–2020), American musician